Lisa LaPorta is an interior designer in Los Angeles who has appeared on several HGTV reality programs including Designed to Sell, Designers' Challenge, and Designing for the Sexes.

Education
LaPorta received her professional training in design from the UCLA Department of Environmental Art and Design.
Lisa has been featured on the many HGTV television shows including
 Designers Challenge,
 Designing for the Sexes,
 Designed to Sell,
 Home for the Holidays,
 Design Star,
 Showdown,
 Summer Showdown,
 Bang for your Buck,
 25 Biggest Renovation Mistakes,
 25 Biggest Selling Mistakes,
 and First Time Design.

References

External links

Living people
American interior designers
American television personalities
American women television personalities
American women interior designers
Year of birth missing (living people)
University of California, Los Angeles alumni
21st-century American women